Septin 10 is a protein that in humans is encoded by the SEPT10 gene.

Function 

This gene encodes a member of the septin family of cytoskeletal proteins with GTPase activity. This protein localizes to the cytoplasm and nucleus and displays GTP-binding and GTPase activity. Alternative splicing results in multiple transcript variants.

References

Further reading